The Ouray County Courthouse, constructed in 1888, is the seat of government of Ouray County, Colorado. It is located at the corner of 6th Avenue and 4th Street in Ouray, Colorado.  This structure is a contributing property of the Ouray Historic District.

The courtroom was used in the John Wayne movie True Grit.

References

External links
Ouray Historical Society

Buildings and structures in Ouray County, Colorado
County courthouses in Colorado
Courthouses on the National Register of Historic Places in Colorado
Historic district contributing properties in Colorado
National Register of Historic Places in Ouray County, Colorado